The Sri Lanka national cricket team are toured India in January and February 1994 to play three Test matches and three One Day Internationals (ODIs).

The tour followed the Sri Lankan's participation in the 1993 Hero Cup, where they reached the semi-final and was surrounded by controversy.

Sri Lanka only toured India after the Pakistan national cricket team pulled out citing security concerns. The Sri Lankan team manager, Bandula Warnapura, as was the case a few months earlier at the Hero Cup, blamed the batting failures of the first two test matches on poor umpiring decisions.

The series was played on spin-friendly pitches on which India had built up a formidable record. India won their eighth straight home win since the defeat of Sri Lanka in 1990-91 and their second successive series whitewash after beating England in 1992-93. Contrary to popular beliefs of the time that test matches in India produced boring draws, this series meant that the last 12 tests, from Madras in 1987-88 had produced a result- 11 wins for India. Azharuddin joined Mansoor Ali Khan Pataudi and Sunil Gavaskar as India's most successful captains, with 9 wins each.

Further cause for celebration for India came when Kapil Dev became test cricket's highest wicket-taker, surpassing Richard Hadlee's tally of 431, which had stood for three and a half years.

Squads

Test series

1st Test

2nd Test

3rd Test

ODI series

1st ODI

2nd ODI

3rd ODI

References

External links 
 Tour home at ESPN Cricinfo

1994 in Indian cricket
1994 in Sri Lankan cricket
Indian cricket seasons from 1970–71 to 1999–2000
International cricket competitions from 1991–92 to 1994
1994